Demoralization can be:

 Decadence, decay of morality
 Demoralization (warfare), damaging an enemy's fighting spirit
 Resentful demoralization, a phenomenon in clinical research